Hüseyin Yoğurtçu (born 30 June 1983) is a Turkish football coach and a former player. He is the manager of amateur side İnegöl Kafkas Gençlikspor.

References

1983 births
Sportspeople from Bursa
Living people
Turkish footballers
Turkey youth international footballers
Association football defenders
Gençlerbirliği S.K. footballers
Yimpaş Yozgatspor footballers
Manisaspor footballers
Yalovaspor footballers
Boluspor footballers
Kayseri Erciyesspor footballers
Mersin İdman Yurdu footballers
Kasımpaşa S.K. footballers
İnegölspor footballers
Süper Lig players
TFF First League players
Turkish football managers